Ashis K. Mukherjee is an Indian biochemist specializing in snake venom biochemistry, molecular biology and microbiology. He served as the Head of the Department of Molecular Biology and Biotechnology of Tezpur University during 2008– 2011. Known for his research on snake venom biochemistry, proteomic composition and other proteins related work from microbial and plant background, Mukherjee serves as the head and coordinator of the Nodal Center for Medical Colleges and Biomedical Research Institutes of North East India at Tezpur University. The Department of Biotechnology of the Government of India awarded him the National Bioscience Award for Career Development, for his contributions to biosciences, in 2013. Mukherjee has also received the Visitor's Award 2018 for research in the fields of basic and applied sciences from the President of India.

Biography 

A. K. Mukherjee, born in Purulia, in the Indian state of West Bengal, graduated in science with honours from Banaras Hindu University in 1990 with first rank and continued at the university for his master's degree in biochemistry which he completed in 1992, again with first rank. Moving to Burdwan Medical College of Burdwan University for his doctoral research as a junior research fellow of UGC-CSIR NET, Mukherjee earned a PhD in 1998; later, he would also receive a DSc from the University of Kolkata in 2017. He joined the Department of Molecular Biology and Biotechnology of Tezpur University in 1997 as a lecturer where he continues his career and holds the position of a professor since 2009, heading the Centre for Petroleum  Biotechnology (CPBT).

Mukherjee also serves as the head and coordinator of the Nodal Center  for Medical Colleges and Biomedical Research Institutes of North East India at Tezpur University and is associated with the University of Connecticut Health Center as a Sabbatical Visitor at their Department of Molecular, Microbial and Structural Biology, School of Medicine, and with the University of Northern Colorado as a visiting scientist at the School of Biological Sciences.

Professional profile 

Mukherjee focuses his research on toxinology with special focus on snake venom biochemistry and has headed a number of projects as the principal investigator. His studies have been documented by way of a number of articles and ResearchGate, an online repository of scientific articles has listed 126 of them. Mukherjee has contributed chapters to books published by others and has guided several masters and doctoral researchers. He is also a resource person for the Tezpur Regional Office of Pollution Control Board. and is one of the founders of Tezpur University chapter of the Toxinology Society of India.

Awards and honors 
Mukherjee, who has received the BOYSCAST fellowship of the Department of Biotechnology, has also received the Young Scientist Award from a number of institutions such as the Indian Science Congress Association, the Association of Medical Biochemists of India, the Zoological Society of India, and the Physiological Society of India. He received the Best Researcher Award of Tezpur University in 2008 and the Assam Science Society awarded him the Dr J. N. Baruah Memorial Science Award in 2010. The Department of Biotechnology (DBT) of the Government of India awarded him the National Bioscience Award for Career Development, one of the highest Indian science awards in 2013. Mukherjee received the Sreenivasaya Memorial Award of the Society of Biological Chemists (India) in 2014. He is also a recipient of the Crest Award and the Units of Excellence Award of the Department of Biotechnology and the Visitor's Award 2018 for research in the fields of basic and applied sciences.

Selected bibliography

Chapters

Articles

See also 

 Apyrase
 Serine protease

Notes

References

External links 
 

N-BIOS Prize recipients
Indian scientific authors
Living people
Indian medical researchers
Scientists from Assam
Indian molecular biologists
Indian biotechnologists
Banaras Hindu University alumni
University of Calcutta alumni
Academic staff of Tezpur University
University of Northern Colorado people
University of Connecticut faculty
1970 births
Scientists from West Bengal